The Loading Program is the fourth release by collaborative group Tuatara.  The release mainly consists of remixes of songs from their first three albums.

Track listing

Tuatara (band) albums
2003 remix albums